Actual Life (April 14 – December 17 2020) is the debut solo album from British producer Fred Gibson under the stage name Fred Again. It was released on April 16, 2021 through again.. Records. The composition of the album involves short clips from various sources, such as YouTube videos and FaceTime conversations, layered with synthesizers. The album revolves around the COVID-19 pandemic and was an outlet for Gibson to explore "a year of finding love and mourning its loss".

The album was preceded by Actual Life, a five track extended play released initially on May 15, 2020 featuring one song present on this album, and extended mixes of "Adam" and "Me". On Apple Music, the EP has a release date of June 12, 2020 and also includes "Marnie (Wish I Had U)".

Critical reception
The album featured at 7th in Double Js 50 best albums of the year.

Track listing

Charts

References

Further reading

2021 debut albums
Albums about the COVID-19 pandemic
Fred Again albums